Beaver Peak is a summit in the U.S. state of Nevada.

Beaver Peak was named for the North American beavers in the area.

References

Mountains of Elko County, Nevada